The London and North Western Railway (LNWR) Class G2A was a class of 0-8-0 steam locomotives.  They were upgraded from LNWR Class G1 principally by the fitting of a higher pressure boiler.   Some of the G2As subsequently received lower pressure boilers on overhaul, taking them back into Class G1.

Numbering
On nationalisation in 1948, British Railways (BR) received 320 G2As, thus making them the largest ex-LNWR class received by BR.  They were numbered in the range 48893–49394 but the number series is not continuous because some numbers in the same range were given to G1 Class locomotives.

Preservation
None were preserved, although a very similar LNWR Class G2 No. 49395 was.

References

Further reading
 Bob Essery & David Jenkinson An Illustrated Review of LMS Locomotives Vol. 2 Absorbed Pre-Group Classes Western and Central Divisions
 Edward Talbot, The London & North Western Railway Eight-Coupled Goods Engines
 Willie Yeadon, Yeadon's Compendium of LNWR Locomotives Vol 2 Goods Tender Engines

G2A
0-8-0 locomotives
Standard gauge steam locomotives of Great Britain
D h2 locomotives